The Southeastern Cave Conservancy (SCCi) is a United States not-for-profit corporation dedicated to cave conservation, caver education, and cave management. It was formed in 1991 by a group of southeastern United States cavers. The SCCi is an institutional member of the  National Speleological Society.

According to its Articles of Incorporation, the organization's purpose is "to acquire and manage caves for scientific study, education of those persons interested in speleology, and conservation of these resources".

Caves and preserves
The organization owns or leases  of land in six states, 170+ caves, 32 cave preserves, and over $1.5 million in land assets. The SCCi is particularly interested in caves that are threatened with closure or destruction or those that provide a habitat for endangered species such as the gray bat, Tennessee cave salamander, and Hart's-tongue fern. 

Caves and preserves owned or leased by the organization are listed below.

Alabama
Anderson Cave (one major cave and four smaller caves), Shelby County
Falling Cave, Jackson County
Fern Cave (Surprise Pit entrance), Jackson County
Glove Pit, Madison County
 Horse Skull and Jack's Hole, Jackson County
Kennamer Cave (two caves), Jackson County
Jacobs Mountain Preserve, Jackson County
Limrock Blowing Cave Preserve, Jackson County
Neversink Cave, Jackson County
Steward Spring Cave, DeKalb County
Stephens Gap Callahan Cave Preserve (five caves), Jackson County
Tumbling Rock Cave, Jackson County
Valhalla Cave (one major cave and three smaller ones), Jackson County

Florida
Hollow Ridge, Jackson County
Jennings Cave, Marion County

Georgia
Fox Mountain (at least seven caves), Dade County
Frick's Cave, Walker County
Charles B. Henson Cave Preserve at Johnsons Crook (at least 34 caves, Dade County
Howard's Waterfall Cave, Dade County

Kentucky
Frenchman Knob Cave, Hart County
Logsdon Cave (William R. Halliday Cave Preserve), Hart County

Tennessee
Gourdneck Cave, Marion County
Holly Creek Cave, Wayne County
Mayapple Cave and Meander Cave, Grundy County
Rattling Cave, Cocke County
Run To The Mill Cave Preserve, Cumberland County
Sinking Cove (includes five major caves and five smaller ones), Franklin County
Snail Shell Cave, Rutherford County
South Pittsburg Pit,  Marion County
Wolf River Cave, Fentress County

West Virginia
Lobelia Saltpeter Cave, Pocahontas County

References

External links 
 Southeastern Cave Conservancy website

Cave conservancies
Environmental organizations based in the United States